A dui is a type of Chinese ritual bronze vessel used in the late Zhou dynasty and the Warring States period of ancient China. It was a food container used as a ritual vessel. Most dui consist of two bowls supported on three legs.

Form

The dui is typically spherical in shape, possessing a half-domed bowl on bottom with a similarly shaped container fitting on top.  Shapes vary from circular, ovular, or subcircular.  Types from the late Eastern Zhou appear more spheroidal; containers become more ovular during the Spring and Autumn period; and transitioning from the late Spring and Autumn to the Warring States period, vessel types appear less round in shape, possessing a flattened lid paired with a rounded bowl. The vessel stands on either a single pedestal or is supported by three legs (similarly to the ding).  The three legs would permit heating of the food within.  Each vessel sports two handles; either set or unfixed rings adorn the bottom portion of the vessel, allowing for easy transport.

Decor
The containers themselves possess highly intricate detailing, varying in geometric and curvilinear designs distributed in symmetrical registers.  Many of these carvings assume biomorphic forms, depicting typical animal imagery found throughout ancient China such as cats, snakes, dragons or birds.   Much of the designs are in-laid with metal, though few complete renditions still exist.

Examples
From the specimen found from the Warring States period, proof of copper in-lay can be found in swirling spherical patterns that accentuate the shape of the dui.  Incised geometric patterning along with cat-like outlines emanate from the container.

Types coming out of the Late Eastern Zhou are spherical in form and possess three animal masks in relief; the heads are situated symmetrically around the lid, mirroring the three ding-like feet supporting the base.  Simple linear patterning covers the vessel in clearly defined registers, while high-relief rope bands separate the basin from the lid.

From the Warring States period, ovular forms become subcircular shapes.  Four fantastical creatures adorn the lid of this period's example, forming upright rings.  Animal pendant masks hold moveable rings in their mouths, allowing for easy transport.  In-lay patterning surfaces in this example too, with turquoise and silver in typical registers.  Curvilinear patterns accentuate the shape; the more prominent bands of decoration portray symmetrical bird figures with intertwining bodies encircling the vessel.  Border designs consist of S-shaped bands around the foot, lid, and body.

Function and Usage
In some examples the two symmetric hemispheres could be used individually or as a bowl with lid when facilitating the ritual process. Lidded varieties are evidenced by the lack of supporting structure on each bowl.  The vessel might be displayed prominently within a temple or hall but also found use during feasts commemorating ancestors. At times, the vessel was produced solely for burial. In later periods the vessel became a symbol of societal prominence and the religious aspect receded.

Historical Development

The dui functioned and was created in the Late Zhou dynasties and Warring States period in early China. The dui is one of the earliest types of near-spherical shape of vessel.  In the middle of the Spring and Autumn period, people gradually began to use the dui as a warming and serving food vessel.  According to scholar K.C. Chang, the term "dui" was said to have been written in the catalogue incorrectly by cataloguers from the Song dynasty. First seen in Eastern Zhou, "dui" means "gobular vessel", but in Shang and Western Zhou, this particular vessel was called "gui". "Dui" was transcribed into the modern equivalent of "gui".

Some dui vessels were inspired by nomadic Steppe art with sophisticated designs and colorful exteriors. After the Eastern Zhou dynasty, the dui might have been seen as a status symbol or used in various rituals. It was most popular during the Late Zhou Dynasty, but later it was replaced by another food container named "sheng" that was used during the Qin and Han dynasties. In the Warring States Period, the form was changed to an oval and the lid was transformed to reflect the body in a mirror image. They are sometimes marked as "watermelon ding" which were dated back to the early Warring States Period.

Important specimens
The Chen Hou Yinqi dui (陳侯因齊敦), cast by King Wei of Qi (r. 356–320 BCE), bears an inscription containing the earliest attestation of the Yellow Emperor in the historical record.

In 2004, there was a dui vessel discovered in tomb M6 in Zhenghan Road, Xinzheng City by the Xinzheng Work Station of the Henan Provincial Cultural Relics and Archaeology Institute.

References

Works cited

External links

The great bronze age of China: an exhibition from the People's Republic of China, an exhibition catalog from The Metropolitan Museum of Art (fully available online as PDF), which contains material on duis
 "dui." Encyclopædia Britannica Online. Encyclopædia Britannica Inc., 2012. 06 Feb. 2012.
 Bronze Dui, website of Colby College.

Chinese bronzeware
Containers